Flight Log (1966–1976) is a compilation album by the American rock band Jefferson Airplane. Released in January 1977 as a double-LP as Grunt CYL2-1255, it is a compilation of Jefferson Airplane and Airplane-related tracks, including tracks by Jefferson Starship and Hot Tuna, as well as solo tracks by Paul Kantner, Grace Slick, and Jorma Kaukonen. Although primarily a compilation album, the album includes one previously unreleased song: "Please Come Back" written by Ron Nagle and performed by Jefferson Starship.  "Please Come Back" is not available on any other release.

Among the session musicians featured on the album are two members of the Grateful Dead and one member of Crosby, Stills, Nash & Young.  David Crosby appears on one track, and Jerry Garcia plays on three tracks, two of which also feature Mickey Hart.

The album included a lavish 12-page full-color, full-size (12 sq.in.) booklet, containing photographs of the band throughout the period covered by the compilation. It also contained a detailed history of the band, written by Patrick Snyder of Rolling Stone magazine.

Flight Log was first reissued on CD by BMG Japan on October 22, 2008, as a part of the "Paper Sleeve Collection" reissue series (BVCM-35468-9). The release features an exact reproduction of the Grunt 1977 edition of the LP packaging including a reduced scale reproduction of the original booklet and inner sleeve jackets for the CDs.  Also included is a second booklet containing all the lyrics in both English and Japanese. The only omission by BMG Japan was not reproducing the original GRUNT label on the CDs. The audio quality is as good as the original master tapes available for the Japanese LP pressing and features JVC K2 24 Bit Remastering. However, it sounds as if the master tapes had been damaged on at least three songs, and significantly obvious on the introduction of "Silver Spoon". CD 1 contains Side A and B, and CD 2 contains Side C and D.

On April 5, 2011, BGO Records released a remastered edition of Flight Log in a standard jewel case with cardboard slip cover. The BGO version is said to be a sonic improvement on the BMG/Sony edition; nonetheless, certain tape defects such as on Silver Spoon still exist.

Track listing (with artist)

Personnel

Signe Anderson – vocals
Marty Balin – vocals
Skip Spence – drums
Paul Kantner – vocals, rhythm guitar
Jorma Kaukonen – lead guitar, acoustic guitar, vocals
Jack Casady – bass
Grace Slick – vocals, piano
Spencer Dryden – drums
Jerry Garcia – guitar, pedal steel guitar, lead guitar
Nicky Hopkins – piano
Will Scarlett – harmonica
David Crosby – vocals, guitar
Mickey Hart – percussion, gongs
Joey Covington – drums, vocals
Papa John Creach – violin
John Barbata – drums
Sammy Piazza – drums
Nick Buck – piano
David Freiberg – vocals, keyboards, bass, rhythm guitar
Craig Chaquico – lead guitar
Jack Traylor – vocals
Chris Ethridge – bass
Tom Hobson – guitar
Pete Sears – bass, rhythm guitar
Three of the tracks have contributions from members of the Grateful Dead.

Production
Bill Thompson – manager
Jacky Kaukonen – secretary
Bill Laudner – road manager
Pat Ieraci (Maurice) – production coordinator, album coordinator
Paul Dowell – equipment manager
Roger Ressmeyer, Tony Lane, Jim Marshall, Dave Patrick, B. Beckhard, Jim Smircich, Charles Stewart, Randy Tuten – photography
Mastered by John Golden, Kendun Recorders, Burbank
Craig DeCamps – booklet design
Acy R. Lehman – cover and art direction
Takuya Matsuyama – product director for Japanese release
Asami Konno – creative coordinator for Japanese release
Kazuhisa Fujita – design for Japanese release
STRANGE DAYS – support for Japanese release

References

External links

1977 greatest hits albums
Hot Tuna compilation albums
Jefferson Airplane compilation albums
Jefferson Starship albums
Split albums
Grunt Records compilation albums